Mitromorpha brevispira is a species of sea snail, a marine gastropod mollusk in the family Mitromorphidae.

Description
The length of the shell attains 3.9 mm, its diameter 1.9 mm.

Distribution
This marine species occurs off Transkei, South Africa.

References

 Kilburn R.N. (1986). Turridae (Mollusca: Gastropoda) of southern Africa and Mozambique. Part 3. Subfamily Borsoniinae. Annals of the Natal Museum. 27: 633–720

External links
 
 Worldwide Mollusc Species Data Base: Mitromorpha brevispira

Endemic fauna of South Africa
brevispira
Gastropods described in 1986